The 2006 Tour du Haut Var was the 38th edition of the Tour du Haut Var cycle race and was held on 18 February 2006. The race started and finished in Draguignan. The race was won by Leonardo Bertagnolli.

General classification

References

2006
2006 in road cycling
2006 in French sport
February 2006 sports events in France